The following lists events that happened during 1916 in South Africa.

Incumbents
 Monarch: King George V.
 Governor-General and High Commissioner for Southern Africa: The Viscount Buxton.
 Prime Minister: Louis Botha.
 Chief Justice: James Rose Innes

Events
February
 12 – In the Battle of Salaita Hill, South African and other British Empire troops fail to take a German East African defensive position.

July
 14-16 – During the Battle of Delville Wood, 766 men from the South African Brigade are killed in South Africa's biggest loss in the First World War.

September
 4 – Dar es Salaam surrenders to British Empire forces.

Births
 12 January – P.W. Botha, politician, Prime Minister and State President. (d. 2006)
 15 January – Rachel Alida de Toit, actor who performed under the name Lydia Lindeque. (d. 1997)
 28 March – Abraham Manie Adelstein, South African-born Chief Medical Statistician of the United Kingdom. (d. 1992)
 1 July – Thomas Hamilton-Brown, boxer.

Deaths
 5 June – The Earl Kitchener, British military commander during the Second Boer War. (b. 1850)
 28 November – Martinus Theunis Steyn, last State President of the Orange Free State. (b. 1857)

Railways

Railway lines opened
 18 February – Transvaal – Morgenzon to Amersfoort, .
 25 May – Natal – Boughton to Cedara deviation, .
 5 June – Transvaal – Volksrust to Amersfoort, .
 30 June – Free State – Aliwal North (Cape) to Zastron, .
 31 July – Free State – Vierfontein to Bothaville, .
 18 September – Cape – Idutywa to Umtata, .
 2 October – Cape – Williston to Kootjieskolk, .
 18 October – Transvaal – Delareyville to Pudimoe (Cape), .

 November – Cape – Ascot to Tygerberg, .
 24 November – Natal – Donnybrook to Underberg, .

Locomotives
 The South African Railways places six  4-6-2 Pacific type steam locomotives in service on the Langkloof narrow gauge line.

References

South Africa
Years in South Africa
History of South Africa